Erwin Vandendaele (born 5 March 1945) was a Belgian football player who won the Belgian Golden Shoe in 1971 while at Club Brugge.  He played 32 times for the national team between 1970 and 1977, starting in a 1–2 friendly defeat to France on 15 November 1970.  In the summer of 1974 Vandendaele moved to the rival Anderlecht. In 1976 he won the UEFA Super Cup with Anderlecht after a legendary 4-1 win in the second leg over FC Bayern Munich. After his football career Vandendaele founded a tennis club in his hometown Asper. Since 2005 he has been working as a talent scout for K.A.A. Gent.

Honours

Club

Club Brugge 

 Belgian First Division: 1972–73
 Belgian Cup: 1967–68, 1969–70

RSC Anderlecht 

 Belgian Cup: 1974–75, 1975–76
 European Cup Winners' Cup: 1975–76 (winners), 1976–77 (runners-up), 1977–78 (winners)
 Amsterdam Tournament: 1976
Tournoi de Paris: 1977
 Jules Pappaert Cup: 1977

KAA Gent 

 Belgian Second Division: 1979–80

International

Belgium 

 UEFA European Championship: 1972 (third place)

Individual 

 Belgian Golden Shoe: 1971
Platina Eleven (Best Team in 50 Years of Golden Shoe Winners) (2003)

References

External links
 
 
 
 

1945 births
Living people
Footballers from Metz
Belgian footballers
Belgium international footballers
Belgian Pro League players
Club Brugge KV players
R.S.C. Anderlecht players
Stade de Reims players
Ligue 1 players
K.A.A. Gent players
1970 FIFA World Cup players
UEFA Euro 1972 players
Belgian expatriate footballers
French footballers
Belgian football managers
R.W.D. Molenbeek managers
K.A.A. Gent managers
K.M.S.K. Deinze managers
Association football midfielders
Footballers from East Flanders
Belgian people of German descent
Association football scouts
People from Gavere